Quality is an unincorporated community that is in Butler County, Kentucky, United States. 

Quality has been noted for its unusual place name.

Geography
Quality is located in the southwestern portion of Butler County just north of the Logan County line. The community is located around the junction of Kentucky State Routes 106 and 1153.

Post office
The community's post office operated from 1853 to 1995. It originally operated with zip code 42268.

Notable person
 Staff Sergeant Don J. Jenkins, Medal of Honor recipient for his service during the Vietnam War

References

Unincorporated communities in Butler County, Kentucky
Unincorporated communities in Kentucky